This is a list of Swedish entrepreneurs and business people.

Ola Ahlvarsson (born 1970), founder of Result
David Axmark, co-founder of MySQL
Percy Barnevik (born 1941), industry leader (ABB)
Per-Ingvar Brånemark (1929-2014), osseointegration, titanium dental prostheses 
Gustaf Dalén (1869-1937), founder of AGA and Nobel Prize laureate
Nils Ericson (1802-1860), railroad pioneer (SJ)
John Ericsson (1803-1889), inventor and engineer (USS Monitor)
Lars Magnus Ericsson (1846-1926), founder of Ericsson
Joakim Fohlman, founder of Safer Uppsala County and the Foundation for Safer Sweden
Assar Gabrielsson (1891-1962), industrialist, co-founder of Volvo
Bertil Hult (born 1941), businessman, founder of EF Education First
Jonas af Jochnick (born 1937), founder of Oriflame
Kerstin af Jochnick (born 1958), banker
Robert af Jochnick (born 1940), founder of Oriflame
Johan Petter Johansson (1853-1943), inventor
Ingvar Kamprad (1926-2018), founder of IKEA
Bert Karlsson (born 1945), owner and manager of Mariann Grammofon AB
Mathilda Hamilton (1864–1935), missionary and entrepreneur
Ivar Kreuger (1880-1932), industrialist and financier
Håkan Lans (born 1947), inventor
Gustav de Laval (1845-1913), founder of Alfa Laval
Beatrice Lesslie (1890–1967), ran the Gothenburg clothing firm Konfektions AB Lesslie
Birger Ljungström (1872-1948), engineer
Fredrik Ljungström (1875-1964), industrialist
Adolf H. Lundin (1932-2006), oil and mining entrepreneur
Alfred Nobel (1833-1896), industrialist, instituted the Nobel Prizes
Birger Nordholm (1897-1989), entrepreneur
Erling Persson (1917-2002), founder of Hennes & Mauritz
Markus Persson (born 1979), founder of Mojang AB, creator of Minecraft
Johanna Petersson (1807–1899), pioneering businesswoman from Ödeshög
Ruben Rausing (1895-1983), founder of Tetra Pak
Pär Olof Sandå (born 1965), entrepreneur, developer and stockbroker
Lars Olsson Smith (1836-1913), spirits manufacturer
Johan Stael von Holstein, founder of Icon MediaLab
Helena Stjernholm (born 1970), CEO of the financial firm Industrivärden
Frans Suell (1744-1818), founder of Malmö harbour
Johan Ullman (born 1953), working in ergonomy, occupational orthopedics
Torsten Ullman
Olof Wallenius (1902-1970)
Axel Wenner-Gren, founder of Electrolux
Jonas Wenström, industrialist
Sven Wingquist (1876-1953), engineer, inventor, industrialist, co-founder of SKF
Niklas Zennström, founder of KaZaA and Skype

See also
Confederation of Swedish Enterprise
List of Swedish companies
Stockholm Stock Exchange

Entrepreneurs
Swedish